Sir George William John Benjamin, CBE (born 31 January 1960) is an English composer of contemporary classical music. He is also a conductor, pianist and teacher. He is well known for operas Into the Little Hill (2006), Written on Skin (2009–2012) and Lessons in Love and Violence (2015–2017)—all with librettos by Martin Crimp. In 2019, critics at The Guardian ranked Written on Skin as the second best work of the 21st-century.

Biography
Benjamin was born in London and attended Westminster School. Prof. Benjamin studied piano privately with concert pianist and eminent teacher, Marguerite Tury from 1967–74, wrote his first composition at age nine, and took piano and composition lessons with Peter Gellhorn until the age of 15, after which Gellhorn arranged for Benjamin to continue his lessons in Paris with Olivier Messiaen, whom he had known for many years. Messiaen was reported to have described Benjamin as his favourite pupil. He then read music at King's College, Cambridge, studying under Alexander Goehr and Robin Holloway.

His orchestral piece Ringed by the Flat Horizon (written for the Cambridge University Musical Society and premiered in Cambridge under the baton of Mark Elder on 5 March 1980) was performed at The Proms that August, while he was still a student, making him the youngest living composer to have had music performed at the Proms. The London Sinfonietta and Sir Simon Rattle, premiered At First Light two years later. Antara was commissioned by IRCAM for the 10th anniversary of the Pompidou Centre in 1987 and Three Inventions for chamber orchestra were written for the 75th Salzburg Festival in 1995. The London Symphony Orchestra under Pierre Boulez premiered Palimpsests in 2002 to mark the opening of ‘By George’, a season-long portrait which included the first performance of Shadowlines by Pierre-Laurent Aimard. More recent celebrations of Benjamin's work have taken place at Southbank Centre in 2012 (as part of the UK's Cultural Olympiad) and at the Barbican in 2016.

Benjamin's first operatic work Into the Little Hill, written with playwright Martin Crimp, was commissioned in 2006 by the Festival d'Automne in Paris. It received its London premiere at the Royal Opera House in February 2009. Their second collaboration, Written on Skin, premiered at the Aix-en-Provence Festival in July 2012. Benjamin conducted the UK premiere at the Royal Opera House, Covent Garden, in March 2013. Lessons in Love and Violence, a third collaboration with Martin Crimp, premiered at the Royal Opera House in 2018.

As a conductor, he regularly appears with some of the world's leading ensembles and orchestras, amongst them the London Sinfonietta, Ensemble Modern, the Cleveland and Concertgebouw orchestras, and the Junge Deutsche Philharmonie. In 1999, he made his operatic debut conducting Pelléas et Mélisande at la Monnaie, Brussels, and he has conducted numerous world premieres, including works by Wolfgang Rihm, Unsuk Chin, Gérard Grisey, and György Ligeti. In 1993, he curated the first Meltdown music festival in London and in 2010 he was the Music Director of the Ojai Music Festival in California. During the 2018/2019 season, Benjamin was Composer in Residence to the Berliner Philharmoniker.

For sixteen years, Benjamin taught composition at the Royal College of Music, London, where he became the first Prince Consort Professor of Composition before succeeding Sir Harrison Birtwistle as Henry Purcell Professor of Composition at King's College London in January 2001. His pupils include Luke Bedford and Dai Fujikura.

Honours 
In 2019, Benjamin was awarded the Golden Lion Award for lifetime achievement from the Venice Biennale. Other awards include the 2001 Arnold Schönberg Prize, the 2015 Prince Pierre of Monaco composition prize (for his opera Written on Skin), and 2023 the Ernst von Siemens Music Prize. An honorary fellow of King's College Cambridge, the Guildhall School of Music and Drama, the Royal College of Music and the Royal Academy of Music, Benjamin is also an Honorary Member of the Royal Philharmonic Society. He was awarded a C.B.E. in 2010, made a Commandeur de l’Ordre des Arts et des Lettres in 2015, and was knighted in the 2017 Queen's Birthday Honours.

Personal life 
Benjamin now lives in northwest London with his partner, the filmmaker Michael Waldman, whose recent credits include The Day John Lennon Died, The Scandalous Adventures of Lord Byron, and the TV miniseries Musicality.

Selected works
Source

Opera 

 Into the Little Hill (2006) text: Martin Crimp
 Written on Skin (2009–2012) text: Martin Crimp
 Lessons in Love and Violence (2015–2017) text: Martin Crimp
 Picture a day like this (2023) text: Martin Crimp

Orchestral 

Ringed by the Flat Horizon for orchestra (1979–1980)
A Mind of Winter for soprano and orchestra (1981) text: Wallace Stevens
Sudden Time for large orchestra (1989–1993)
Three Inventions for chamber orchestra (1993–1995)
Sometime Voices for baritone, chorus and orchestra (1996) text: William Shakespeare
Palimpsests for orchestra (2000–2002)
Dance Figures, nine choreographic scenes for orchestra (2004)
 Duet for piano and orchestra (2008)
Dream of the Song for countertenor, female chorus and orchestra (2014–2015) texts: Solomon Ibn Gabirol and Samuel HaNagid, trans. Peter Cole; Federico García Lorca
 Concerto for Orchestra (2021)

Ensemble 

 Octet for 8 players (1978)
At First Light for 14 players (1982)
Antara for 16 players and electronics (1987)
Upon Silence for mezzo-soprano and viols/strings (1990) text: Yeats
Olicantus for 15 players (2002)

Chamber and instrumental 

 Piano Sonata (1977–1978)
Flight for solo flute (1979)
Three Studies for piano (1982–1985)
Viola, Viola for viola duo (1997)
Shadowlines – six canonic preludes for piano (2001)
Three Miniatures for solo violin (2001–2002)
Piano Figures – ten short pieces for piano (2004)

References

Further reading
Alex Ross,  "Illuminated: George Benjamin's long-awaited masterpiece", The New Yorker, 25 March 2013.
Andrew Powell,  "Written On Skin, at Length", Musical America, 24 August 2013.
George Benjamin's page at King's College London
Page on the website of Faber Music, Benjamin's publisher, with biography, catalogue of works and details of forthcoming performances
George Benjamin, "In the realm of the senses" (article on György Ligeti) The Guardian, 23 February 2007.
Education project on collection "Piano Figures" – George Benjamin explains his work in short films
 
Luiz Gazzola (Almaviva),  "The Exclusive Opera Lively Interview with composer George Benjamin" on operalively.com, 25 July 2013
 
Interview with George Benjamin, 18 April 2005
 

1960 births
Living people
People educated at Westminster School, London
Alumni of King's College, Cambridge
20th-century classical composers
21st-century classical composers
English classical composers
English classical pianists
Male classical pianists
English opera composers
Male opera composers
Academics of King's College London
Fellows of King's College London
Academics of the Royal College of Music
Honorary Members of the Royal Academy of Music
International Rostrum of Composers prize-winners
English conductors (music)
British male conductors (music)
LGBT classical composers
Commanders of the Order of the British Empire
Chevaliers of the Ordre des Arts et des Lettres
Conservatoire de Paris alumni
Musicians from London
English male classical composers
Jewish classical composers
20th-century English composers
Knights Bachelor
Composers awarded knighthoods
21st-century British composers
British male pianists
20th-century British conductors (music)
21st-century British conductors (music)
21st-century classical pianists
20th-century British male musicians
20th-century British musicians
21st-century British male musicians
British expatriates in France